Castle Death is the seventh book in the Lone Wolf book series created by Joe Dever.

Gameplay

Lone Wolf books rely on a combination of thought and luck. Certain statistics such as combat skill and endurance attributes are determined randomly before play (reading). The player is then allowed to choose which Magnakai disciplines or skills he or she possess. This number depends directly on how many books in the series have been completed ("Magnakai rank"). With each additional book completed, the player chooses one additional Magnakai discipline.

Plot

In his quest to attain Kai Grand Master status, Lone Wolf must seek out and find 7 Lorestones.  After obtaining the Lorestone of Varetta in the previous book and absorbing its wisdom and power, the location of the next Lorestone is revealed as the remote township of Herdos.  Here, Lone Wolf is directed by friendly Elder Magi to search within the accursed fortress of Kazan-Oud, otherwise known as "Castle Death".

External links
Gamebooks - Lone Wolf
Gamebooks - Castle Death
Project Aon - Castle Death

Lone Wolf (gamebooks)
1986 fiction books
Berkley Books books